Dalton Maldonado  (born October 20, 1995) is an American high school basketball player and LGBT rights activist, who came to National prominence when he shared his harrowing tale of intimidation when he came out at a high school basketball game in Kentucky.

In 2015, he was featured as one of the most influential people in the LGBT community by the magazine Out and he was named "Person of the Year" by Outsports.  He grew up in Kentucky and became known after coming out after a basketball game. His coming out gained national attention after being featured in Outsports magazine. Maldonado wants to make sure no other teen endures the harassment he received after coming out in December 2014.

Following reports that he had been harassed because of his sexuality by the rival team from Bryan Station High School, both schools were challenged in the press.  Both schools said that they had conducted internal investigations and denied any wrongdoing.  
The Fayette County Public Schools administration's investigation concluded that the event "was inaccurately reported and mischaracterized" by media.

After coming out, Maldonado's picture was left out of the two-page spread that commemorated his basketball team in his senior yearbook. In addition to the team photo, there were individual call-outs for every member of the team except Maldonado.
His school, Betsy Layne High School, claimed that the omission was accidental and that the school district "holistically supports Dalton Maldonado just as we do all our students".  They point out that the book includes 15 photos of Maldonado, including many that show him playing basketball.

Maldonado has a fragrance released by Xyrena called Formula 3, sales of which will support the LGBT sports organization "You Can Play". Fragrance industry analysts Basenotes claim that this is "the first signature fragrance from an openly gay athlete".

As of December 2015, Dalton is attending college at the University of Louisville, where he is starting a chapter of GO! Athletes. He was the recipient of the CorTech "Make an Impact" Scholarship Award.

Maldonado was invited to speak at The Atlantic's inaugural LGBT summit in Washington D.C. in December 2015, aiming to "convene wide-ranging conversations on queer identity in America, at the end of a game-changing year in arenas from politics to pop culture".

References

External links
 Feast On Equality 2015 Presentation Video
 Out Sports Person of the Year 2015

Gay sportsmen
LGBT basketball players
Basketball players from Kentucky
People from Floyd County, Kentucky
LGBT people from Kentucky
1995 births
Living people
American men's basketball players
American LGBT sportspeople
21st-century LGBT people